Alfred-Arthur Brunel de Neuville (1852–1941) was a French painter known mainly for paintings of still life and animals, especially cats. His works are in museums at Béziers, Brest, Chateau Thierry, and Louviers.

Brunel de Neuville is buried in Montmartre Cemetery in Paris.

References

Sources
Alfred-Arthur Brunel de Neuville at Burlington Paintings.
Alfred-Arthur Brunel de Neuville at Saighead.com.

Further reading
Júlio Lozada, Artes Plásticas, page 161, São Paulo, Brasil: J. Louzada, 1984  (in Portuguese)

External links
Alfred Arthur Brunel de Neuville at MutalArt.com
 Alfred Arthur Brunel de Neuville Cats in Art

1852 births
1941 deaths
19th-century French painters
French male painters
20th-century French painters
20th-century French male artists
Burials at Montmartre Cemetery
Place of birth missing
19th-century French male artists